James "Sonny" Harris (October 19, 1914 – November 20, 1990) was an American Negro league outfielder who played in the 1930s and 1940s.

A native of Kent, Alabama, Harris was the brother of fellow Negro leaguer Virgil Harris and brother-in-law of Negro leaguer Jesse Houston. He made his Negro leagues debut in 1936 with the Cincinnati Tigers and played for the Tigers again the following season. Harris later played for the Cincinnati Buckeyes in 1942. He died in Cincinnati, Ohio in 1990 at age 76.

References

External links
 and Baseball-Reference Black Baseball stats and Seamheads

1914 births
1990 deaths
Cincinnati Tigers (baseball) players
Cleveland Buckeyes players